De Lawd's Blues is an album by saxophonist Billy Mitchell recorded in 1980 for Xanadu Records.

Reception

The Allmusic review by Scott Yanow stated "Despite the mostly obscure material, the interpretations are purely straight-ahead, falling between bop and hard bop in style. The musicians all play up to par on Mitchell's third and final Xanadu album as a leader".

Track listing
 "B & B" (Billy Mitchell) – 10:48
 "Not Just to Be in Love Again" (Dolo Coker) – 6:11
 "Prompt" (Benny Bailey) – 7:59
 "De Lawd's Blues" (Mitchell) – 11:06
 "Perpetual Stroll" (Rufus Reid) – 12:35

Personnel 
Billy Mitchell – tenor saxophone
Benny Bailey – trumpet
Tommy Flanagan – piano
Rufus Reid – bass
Jimmy Cobb – drums

References

1980 albums
Xanadu Records albums
Billy Mitchell (jazz musician) albums
Albums produced by Don Schlitten